Sir John Blundell Maple, 1st Baronet (1 March 1845 – 24 November 1903) was an English business magnate who owned the furniture maker Maple & Co.

Biography

His father, John Maple (28 February 1815 – 4 March 1900), had a small furniture shop in Tottenham Court Road, London, and his business began to develop about the time that his son entered it. John Jr. was educated at King's College London. He soon took over the practical management of the company, and expanded it considerably. The firm became a limited liability company with a capital of two million pounds in 1890, with Maple as chairman.

He entered Parliament as Conservative member for Dulwich in 1887, serving until his death in 1903, was knighted in 1892, and was made a baronet in 1897. He was the developer of the Great Central Hotel at Marylebone station, which opened in 1899. 

In Parliament, he sponsored bills in 1891 and 1893 to encourage cheaper train fares for working men, which would have favoured the many clerks in his constituency who commuted to the City.

He was the owner of Childwickbury Stud, a large Thoroughbred Horse breeding operation built on his estate. Appearing at first under the name of "Mr. Childwick," from 1885 onwards he won many important races including two of the British Classics.  

His public benefactions included a hospital and a recreation ground to the city of St Albans, near which his residence, Childwickbury Manor, was situated, and the rebuilding, at a cost of more than £50,000, of University College Hospital, London.

Sir John Maple left a fortune of £2,153,000 at his death in 1903.

Immediate family
Maple married Emily Harriet Merryweather, and the couple had one surviving daughter, Grace Emily (1876–1950). She was married twice and had four children, each by a different father.

In 1896, Grace married Baron Hermann von Eckardstein, who was First Secretary of the German Embassy in 1898 and later Ambassador to the Court of St James. They had one child together, Kit (b. 1899). 

In 1906, Grace had a child, Reginald Benwell, by another man, Dr. C. J. Williams; this child was adopted out secretly because Grace was still married to von Eckardstein. The date of their divorce is unknown.

On 16 August 1910, in Metheringham parish church, Lincolnshire, Grace, still known as "Baroness von Eckardstein", married William Ernest George Archibald Weigall, an MP and later governor of South Australia and a baronet. Six months into the marriage, Grace gave birth to her third child, Heather Campbell (b. March 1911). She was adopted out secretly because her father was Elidor Campbell, son of the 3rd Earl Cawdor, a fact Heather did not discover until very late in her own life. Heather married New Zealand artist Arthur Gordon Tovey and later published a memoir about trying to discover her parentage, Searching for Grace (2010). In 1914, Grace bore her husband a daughter, Priscilla Crystal Frances Blundell Weigall.

The Weigalls lived in a country house called Petwood at Woodhall Spa, Lincolnshire. Petwood is so called because Lady Weigall had it constructed of her favourite wood, her "pet wood". Lady Weigall turned her former home into a hotel in 1933 when the Weigalls moved to Ascot. Petwood was requisitioned by the RAF during World War II. Towards the end of the war it was used as the Officers' Mess for the famous Dambusters 617 Squadron, which was then based at nearby RAF Woodhall Spa. Inside the hotel, the Squadron bar is dedicated to the brave men of 617 Squadron and has memorabilia from that period.

Other descendants
Grace's granddaughter, Priscilla Weigall, was first wife (1935–1943) of the 6th Earl Howe (1908–1984) by whom she had two daughters. One of Sir John's great-great-grandsons is actor Jake Weber.

Arms

Notes

References

External links 
 

1845 births
1903 deaths
Alumni of King's College London
Maple, John Blundell, 1st Baronet
British racehorse owners and breeders
Conservative Party (UK) MPs for English constituencies
Knights Bachelor
Members of London County Council
Politics of the London Borough of Southwark
UK MPs 1886–1892
UK MPs 1892–1895
UK MPs 1895–1900
UK MPs 1900–1906